Shirley Fry and Doris Hart successfully defended their title, defeating Maureen Connolly and Julia Sampson in the final, 6–0, 6–0 to win the ladies' doubles tennis title at the 1953 Wimbledon Championships.

Seeds

  Shirley Fry /  Doris Hart (champions)
  Maureen Connolly /  Julia Sampson (final)
  Helen Fletcher /  Jean Rinkel-Quertier (semifinals)
  Barbara Davidson /  Dorothy Knode (second round)

Draw

Finals

Top half

Section 1

Section 2

Bottom half

Section 3

Section 4

References

External links

Women's Doubles
Wimbledon Championship by year – Women's doubles
Wimbledon Championships
Wimbledon Championships